Amund Nordal Gismervik (born 24 January 1991) is a Norwegian diver. He was born in Stavanger. He competed in 10 metre platform at the 2012 Summer Olympics in London.

References

External links

Norwegian male divers
1991 births
Living people
Sportspeople from Stavanger
Divers at the 2012 Summer Olympics
Olympic divers of Norway